Miranda Cosgrove is an American actress and singer-songwriter. Her career began at the age of three, when she appeared in television commercials. Her film debut came in 2003, when she played Summer Hathaway in School of Rock. She appeared in a number of minor television roles over several years before coming to prominence as Megan Parker on the Nickelodeon TV series Drake & Josh. A few years later, she landed the role of Carly Shay, the lead character in the Nickelodeon TV series iCarly.

As of May 2010, Cosgrove earned $180,000 per episode of iCarly, making her the second-highest-paid child star on television. She was listed in the 2012 edition of Guinness World Records as the highest paid child actress for iCarly. Following the success of iCarly, a soundtrack album was released in June 2008, in which she performed four songs. Her debut album, Sparks Fly, was released on April 27, 2010.

Alliance of Women Film Journalists

Capricho Awards

Common Sense Media Awards

Daytime Emmy Awards

Gracie Allen Awards

Hollywood Teen TV Awards

MTV Awards

MTV Movie Awards

MTV Video Music Awards

Nickelodeon Awards

Australian Kids' Choice Awards

Kids' Choice Awards

Kids' Choice Awards Mexico

Meus Prêmios Nick (Brazil)

UK Kids' Choice Awards

Ology Awards

People's Choice Awards

Teen Choice Awards

Young Artist Awards

See also
Miranda Cosgrove discography
Miranda Cosgrove filmography

References

Cosgrove, Miranda
Awards